Guta is a rural locality (a village) in Zlynkovsky District, Bryansk Oblast, Russia. The population was 69 as of 2010. There are 3 streets.

Geography 
Guta is located 8 km north of Zlynka (the district's administrative centre) by road. Muravinka is the nearest rural locality.

References 

Rural localities in Zlynkovsky District